Dnistrovskyi Raion is a raion (district) of Chernivtsi Oblast, Ukraine. It was created in July 2020 as part of the reform of administrative divisions of Ukraine. The center of the raion is the urban-type settlement of Kelmentsi. Three abolished raions, Kelmentsi, Khotyn, and Sokyriany Raions, part of abolished Novoselytsia Raion, as well as the city of Novodnistrovsk, which was previously incorporated as a city of oblast significance, were merged into Dnistrovskyi Raion. The name of the raion is derived from the Dniester river. Population:

Subdivisions
At the time of establishment, the raion consisted of 10 hromadas:
 Kelmentsi settlement hromada with the administration in the urban-type settlement of Kelmentsi, transferred from Kelmentsi Raion;
 Khotyn urban hromada with the administration in the city of Khotyn, transferred from Khotyn Raion;
 Klishkivtsi rural hromada with the administration in the selo of Klishkivtsi, transferred from Khotyn Raion;
 Livyntsi rural hromada with the administration in the selo of Livyntsi, transferred from Kelmentsi Raion;
 Mamalyha rural hromada with the administration in the selo of Mamalyha, transferred from Novoselytsia Raion;
 Nedoboivtsi rural hromada with the administration in the selo of Nedoboivtsi, transferred from Khotyn Raion;
 Novodnistrovsk urban hromada with the administration in the city of Novodnistrovsk, previously incorporated as a city of oblast significance;
 Rukshyn rural hromada with the administration in the selo of Rukshyn, transferred from Khotyn Raion.
 Sokyriany urban hromada with the administration in the city of Sokyriany, transferred from Sokyriany Raion;
 Vashkivtsi rural hromada with the administration in the selo of Vashkivtsi, transferred from Sokyriany Raion.

References

Raions of Chernivtsi Oblast
Ukrainian raions established during the 2020 administrative reform